Academy Park is a cultural feature park located in the Lafayette Park Historic District of Albany, New York. As an urban park, Academy Park often  equates by extension to its surrounding neighborhood near the Albany city hall. The Eagle Street entrance of the New York Court of Appeals Building faces Academy Park.

History
Academy Park was established in 1882. It was the original site of the Dudley Observatory. The Academy Park Fountain, a prominent landmark that was erected in 1988, is situated opposite the New York Court of Appeals Building.

See also
Old Albany Academy Building

References

Further reading

Municipal parks in the United States
Parks in Albany, New York